is a former Japanese football player and manager.

Coaching career
Kori was born on August 17, 1953. In 1985, he became a manager for Regional Leagues club Kawasaki Steel (later Vissel Kobe) based in Okayama Prefecture. The club won the champions in 1985 season and was promoted to Japan Soccer League first time in the club history. He managed the club until 1991–92 season. In 1993, he became a manager for Kawasaki Steel again and managed the club until 1994. In 1995, Kawasaki Steel was moved to Kobe and was changed the name to Vissel Kobe and was promoted J1 League from 1997. He also served as coach for the youth team. In October 1998, Vissel results were bad and manager Benito Floro was sacked. Kori became a manager as Floro successor. He managed 10 matches in regular season and relegation playoffs in 1998 season. In relegation playoffs, Vissel won the match against Consadole Sapporo and stay J1 League. He resigned end of the 1998 season.

Managerial statistics

References

External links

1953 births
Living people
Osaka University of Commerce alumni
Japanese footballers
Japanese football managers
J1 League managers
Vissel Kobe managers
Association footballers not categorized by position